Jennifer "Jenny" Bolton (born 22 September 1992 in Sheffield, South Yorkshire, England) plays for Great Britain women's national ice hockey team as defensman.

References

1992 births
Living people
English women's ice hockey players
Sportspeople from Sheffield